The spotted blind snake (Afrotyphlops punctatus) is a species of snake in the Typhlopidae family.

References

punctatus
Reptiles described in 1819